The Kimpton Hotel & Restaurant Group, LLC is a San Francisco, California, based hotel and restaurant brand owned by IHG Hotels & Resorts (IHG) since 2015. Founded in 1981 by Bill Kimpton and led by Chief Executive Officer Mike DeFrino, the group was the largest chain of boutique hotels in the United States in 2011. It currently operates 68 hotels in 52 cities with a total of 13,357 bedrooms. New hotels have been announced for Indianapolis, Los Angeles, Paris, Barcelona, Charlottesville, Frankfurt, Grenada, Bali, Tokyo, Shanghai, Hong Kong, Rotterdam and Sanya.

While most Kimpton properties are marketed under their own names as boutique hotels, the company launched two sub-brands in 2005, Hotel Palomar and Hotel Monaco. Each property has a restaurant or bar that is marketed as upscale or trendy. In 2020, Fortune magazine ranked Kimpton Hotels & Restaurants at number 10 on their Fortune List of the Top 100 Companies to Work For in 2020 based on an employee survey of satisfaction. The company also manages and operates hotels owned by other entities, under contract.

On December 16, 2014, IHG announced that it would acquire Kimpton for $430 million in cash. IHG retained the Kimpton brand name within the U.S. and is expanding it globally. As a result of the acquisition, seven of Kimpton's nine hotels in San Francisco left the brand in July 2015.

Hotel brands

Hotel Monaco

 Baltimore, Maryland
 Chicago, Illinois
 Denver, Colorado
 Washington, D.C.
 Philadelphia, Pennsylvania
 Pittsburgh, Pennsylvania
 Portland, Oregon (in the historic Lipman–Wolfe and Company Building)
 Salt Lake City, Utah
 Seattle, Washington

Hotel Palomar

 Philadelphia, Pennsylvania
 Los Angeles, California
 San Diego, California
 Phoenix, Arizona
 Miami Beach, Florida

Other hotels in the US 
In addition to the Hotel Monaco and Palomar Hotel brand hotels, other company hotels include:

Alexandria, Virginia:
Lorien Hotel and Spa
Atlanta, Georgia:
Kimpton Sylvan
Kimpton Overland Hotel
Asheville, North Carolina
Kimpton Arras
Austin, Texas:
Hotel Van Zandt
Boston, Massachusetts:
Nine Zero Hotel
Onyx Hotel
Bozeman, Montana:
Kimpton Armory Hotel
Cambridge, Massachusetts:
Hotel Marlowe
Charlotte, North Carolina
Kimpton Tryon Park
Chicago, Illinois:
The Kimpton Gray Hotel
Cleveland, Ohio:
The Kimpton Schofield Hotel
Dallas, Texas
Kimpton Pittman
Denver, Colorado
The Kimpton Born Hotel
Fort Lauderdale, Florida
Kimpton Goodland
Fort Worth, Texas
Kimpton Harper
Huntington Beach, California:
Kimpton Shorebreak Hotel
Key West, Florida:
Kimpton Fitch Lodge
Kimpton Ella's Cottage
Kimpton Lighthouse
Kimpton Ridley House
Kimpton Winslow's Bungalows
Los Angeles, California:
Kimpton Hotel Wilshire
Kimpton Hotel Everly
Manchester, Vermont:
Kimpton Hotel Taconic
Miami, Florida:
EPIC Hotel
The Angler's Hotel
Surfcomber Hotel
Milwaukee, Wisconsin:
The Kimpton Journeyman Hotel
Nashville, Tennessee
The Kimpton Aertson Midtown
New York City, New York:
Muse Hotel
Eventi Hotel
Omaha, Nebraska
Kimpton Cottonwood
Portland, Oregon:
Kimpton Hotel Vintage Portland
Kimpton Riverplace Hotel
Palm Springs, California:
The Kimpton Rowan Hotel
Sacramento, California:
The Kimpton Sawyer Hotel
San Diego, California:
Palomar San Diego 
San Francisco, California:
Kimpton Sir Francis Drake Hotel
Kimpton Hotel Buchanan
Santa Barbara, California:
Kimpton Canary Hotel
Savannah, Georgia:
The Kimpton Brice Hotel
Seattle, Washington
Kimpton Hotel Vintage
Kimpton Palladian Hotel
Vero Beach, Florida:
Vero Beach Hotel and Spa
Washington, D.C.:
Kimpton Banneker
Kimpton George
Winston-Salem, North Carolina:
The Cardinal Hotel and Residences

Hotels in other countries

Paris, France
Kimpton St Honoré
Amsterdam, Netherlands
Kimpton De Witt Amsterdam
Bangkok, Thailand
Kimpton Maa-Lai
Barcelona, Spain
Kimpton Vividora Hote
Grand Cayman, Cayman Islands:
Kimpton Seafire Resort
Edinburgh, United Kingdom
Kimpton Charlotte Square
Glasgow, United Kingdom
Kimpton Blythswood Square
London, United Kingdom
Kimpton Fitzroy London
Manchester, United Kingdom
Kimpton Clocktower Hotel
Sydney, Australia
Kimpton Margot Hotel
Taipei, Taiwan
Kimpton Da An Hotel
Toronto, Canada
Kimpton Saint George
Tokyo, Japan
Kimpton Shinjuku
Tulum, Mexico
Kimpton Aluna Tulum
Suzhou, China
Kimpton Bamboo Grove Suzhou

Restaurant brands

CAYMAN ISLANDS
Grand Cayman, Cayman Islands:
Ave
Avecita
Coccoloba Bar & Grill
The Pantry Seafire
EUROPE
Paris, France:
Montecito
Sequoia Rooftop Bar
London, England:
Burr & Co
Fitz's
Neptune
Amsterdam, Netherlands:
Celia 
Super Lyan
ASIA
Taipei, Taiwan
The Tarvernist
The Bontanist
Bangkok, Thailand
Stock Room
Ms Jigger
Bar Yard
US
Alexandria, Virginia:
Brabo
Brabo Tasting Room
Atlanta, Georgia
Apron
Rooftop at the Overland
Austin, Texas:
Geraldine's
Baltimore, Maryland:
B&O American Brasserie
Boston, Massachusetts:
Highball Lounge
Cambridge, Massachusetts:
Bambara
Charlotte, North Carolina
Angeline's
Merchant & Trade
Chicago, Illinois:
Boleo
Vol. 39
Fisk & Co.
Dallas, Texas:
Elm and Good
Deep End
Denver, Colorado:
Panzano
Citizen Rail
Goleta, California:
Outpost
Goodbar
Huntington Beach, California:
Pacific Hideaway
Los Angeles, California:
Jane Q
Ever Bar
Double Take
Miami, Florida:
Area 31
Lilt
The Social Club
Milwaukee, Wisconsin:
Tre Rivali
The Outsider
Nashville, Tennessee:
Henley
New York, New York:
NIOS
Philadelphia, Pennsylvania:
Square 1682
Stratus Rooftop Lounge
Red Owl Tavern
Phoenix, Arizona:
Blue Hound Kitchen
Lustre Rooftop Bar
Pittsburgh, Pennsylvania:
The Commoner
Biergarten
Portland, Oregon:
Pazzo Ristorante
Bacchus Bar
Red Star Tavern
Three Degrees
Salt Lake City, Utah:
Bambara-SLC
San Diego, California:
Curadero
Jsix
LOUNGEsix
SummerSalt
San Francisco, California:
Scala's
Starlight Room
Santa Barbara, California:
Finch + Fork
Savannah, Georgia:
Pacci Italian Kitchen + Bar
Seattle, Washington:
Outlier
Shaker & Spear
Pennyroyal
Bookstore Bar
Tulio Ristorante
Sedona, Arizona:
SaltRock Southwest Kitchen
St. Pete Beach, Florida:
Castile
360° Rooftop
Vero Beach, Florida:
Cobalt
Heaton's Reef
Washington, D.C.:
Dirty Habit
Radiator
Firefly
Zentan
DNV Rooftop Bar & Lounge
Winston-Salem, North Carolina:
The Katharine

Company programs

Environment 
The company's environmental program is called Earthcare. Every hotel adopts standard environmentally friendly products and practices, such as eco-friendly cleaning supplies and recycling.

LGBT 
Every year, the company sponsors a red ribbon campaign generating awareness and funds for local HIV service agencies. In addition, local hotels make donations to LGBT charities and host events for local community groups. Kimpton formed K-GLEN, the Kimpton Gay and Lesbian Employee Network, to advise the company on personnel and community outreach concerns. The committee meets quarterly and has representation from every region of the country. The company was included as one of the ten best companies for gay and lesbian employees by The Advocate. It has received a 100% rating on the Corporate Equality Index released by the Human Rights Campaign every year since 2005.

Women InTouch 
The company sponsors Dress for Success Worldwide, an international non-profit organization that provides professional clothing and employment search programs for women.

See also

 List of California companies
 List of companies based in San Francisco

References

External links 

 

 
1981 establishments in California
American companies established in 1981
Boutique resort chains
Companies based in San Francisco
Financial District, San Francisco
Hospitality companies of the United States
Hotels established in 1981
InterContinental Hotels Group brands
LGBT tourism
Privately held companies based in California
Restaurants established in 1981